Michel Gay (born 1 September 1947, in Lyon) is a French illustrator and author of children's books.

He usually creates albums with young animals characters such as Biboundé the penguin. He also illustrates texts written by others. His character Zou the Little Zebra is at the origin of a computer-animated series for television in 2011: Zou.

Publications

Album

Author-illustrator 
1980: Le Loup-Noël, l'École des loisirs
1983: Pousse-poussette, l'École des loisirs
1982: Lapin-express, l'École des loisirs
1983: Petit-avion, l'École des loisirs
1983: Petit-bateau, l'École des loisirs
1983: Petit-camion, l'École des loisirs
1984: Petit hélicoptère, l'École des loisirs
1984: Biboundé, l'École des loisirs
1985: La Surprise de Biboundé, l'École des loisirs
1986: Papa vroum, l'École des loisirs
1987: Biboundissimo, l'École des loisirs
1988: Docteur Biboundé, l'École des loisirs
1989: Dodo tout le monde !, l'École des loisirs
1989: Le Cartable qui fait atchoum, l'École des loisirs
1990: Câline-mi et Câline-moi, l'École des loisirs
1991: Comment naissent les biboundés, l'École des loisirs
1992: Le Blotto de neige, Hachette jeunesse
1992: Blotto et les outils, Hachette jeunesse
1993: Blotto et l'étoile de mer, Hachette jeunesse
1994: Bombyx dessine des lettres, l'École des loisirs
1994: Les albums de la famille loup, Gautier-Languereau
1996: Juste une seconde, l'École des loisirs
1997: Papa trop, l'École des loisirs
1998 Zou, l'École des loisirs
1999: Cromignon, l'École des loisirs
2002: Zou n'a pas peur, l'École des loisirs
2006: Cropetite, l'École des loisirs
2011: Les Sous de Zou, l'École des loisirs

Illustrator 
1980: Boris Moissard, Valentine au grand magasin, l'École des loisirs
1981: Gérard Pussey, Les Citrouilles du diable, l'École des loisirs
1981: Gérard Pussey, Fiston et Gros Papa, 
1981: Jean-Loup Trassard,  Trois Noëls en forêt, l'École des loisirs
1982: Irène Schwartz, Minie Malakoff, la souris du métro, l'École des loisirs
1989: Marie-Aude Murail, Le hollandais sans peine, L'École des loisirs, Prix Sorcières 1990
1990: , Copain trop copain, l'École des loisirs
1990: Geneviève Brisac, Olga, l'École des loisirs
1993 Elsa Devernois, À trois on a moins froid, l'École des loisirs
1996: Geneviève Brisac, Olga va à la pêche, l'École des loisirs
2001: Geneviève Brisac, Olga et le chewing-gum magique, l'École des loisirs

External links 
 Présentation sur le site de L'École des loisirs
 List of works
 Michel Gay's latest publications

20th-century French illustrators
French children's book illustrators
French children's writers
1947 births
Artists from Lyon
Living people
Writers from Lyon